The Mauritian rupee (sign: Re (singular) and Rs (plural); ISO code: MUR) is the currency of Mauritius. One rupee is subdivided into 100 cents. Several other currencies are also called rupee.

Coins

In 1877, coins for 1, 2, 5, 10 and 20 cents were introduced, with the lower three denominations in copper and the higher two in silver. Coin production ceased in 1899 and did not recommence until 1911, with silver coins not produced again until 1934, when Re. , Re.  and Re. 1/- coins were introduced. In 1947, cupro-nickel 10 cents were introduced, with cupro-nickel replacing silver in 1950.

In 1971 a new set of coins and banknotes were introduced by the Royal Mint.  This set has Queen Elizabeth II on the obverse and a range of heraldic motives on the reverse. Some of the reverse designs for this set were designed by Christopher Ironside OBE including the Rs. 10/-, Rs. 200/- and Rs. 250/- (issued 1988).

In 1987, a new series of coins was introduced which, for the first time, did not feature the portrait of the monarch (Mauritius did not become a republic until 1992) but that of Sir Seewoosagur Ramgoolam. This coinage consisted of copper-plated-steel 1c and 5c (the 5c was substantially reduced in size), nickel-plated-steel 20c and Re. , and cupro-nickel Re. 1/- and Rs. 5/-. Cupro-nickel Rs. 10/- were introduced in 1997. Coins currently in circulation are the 5c, 20c, Re. , Re. 1/-, Rs. 5/-, Rs. 10/- and Rs. 20/-. Coins below Re. 1/- in value are generally regarded as small-change. The 1c coin has not been seen in circulation for many years, and the last series of 1 cent coins issued in 1987 are only seen as collectors' items.

In 2007, a bi-metallic Rs. 20/- coin was issued to commemorate the 40th anniversary of the Bank of Mauritius, and this has now become a coin in general circulation.

Banknotes

The first banknotes were issued by the government dated 1876 in denominations of Rs. 5/-, Rs. 10/- and Rs. 50/-. Re. 1/- banknotes were added in 1919. In 1940, emergency issues were made of 25c and 50c and Re. 1/-. In 1954, Rs. 25/- and Rs. 1,000/- were introduced.

The Bank of Mauritius was established in September 1967 as the nation's central bank and has been responsible for the issue of banknotes and coins since that time. The bank issued its first notes in 1967, comprising four denominations: Rs. 5/-, Rs. 10/-, Rs. 25/-, and Rs. 50/-, all undated and featuring a portrait of Queen Elizabeth II on the obverse. Over the years, some denominations were revised with new signatures of the Bank's Governor and managing director but were otherwise unchanged.

In 1985, the Bank of Mauritius issued a completely new set of banknotes of Rs. 5/-, Rs. 10/-, Rs. 20/-, Rs. 50/-, Rs. 100/-, Rs. 200/-, Rs. 500/- and Rs. 1,000/-. A close study of these banknotes reveals an interesting array of subsets which were printed by two banknote printing companies (Bradbury Wilkinson and Thomas de La Rue). The banknotes were also designed at different time periods as there are very few identical and consistent design features appearing on all the denominations. Varying banknote numbering systems, different types of security threads, variations in the design and size of the Mauritian Coat of Arms, different ultraviolet light latent printing, inconsistent variations in the size incrementation between the denominations and multiple different typesets are just a few of the differences. This issue lasted up to 1998.

In 1998, The Bank of Mauritius made a new issue of banknotes consisting of 7 denominations, viz. Rs. 25/-, Rs. 50/-, Rs. 100/-, Rs. 200/-, Rs. 500/-, Rs. 1,000/- and Rs. 2,000/-. These banknotes had a standard format and were all issued simultaneously in November 1998. All the banknotes of this issue were printed in England by Thomas de la Rue Limited. These first banknotes were withdrawn from circulation in June 1999 following controversies due to the ordering of the text (English, Sanskrit, Tamil) as the Tamil population is said to have arrived in Mauritius prior to the North Indian community affiliated with Hindi.

The Bank of Mauritius made its latest issue of banknotes, which is still current, after June 1999.

Currently circulating banknotes

Obverse designs

Each denomination bears a hand engraved portrait of a prominent Mauritian figure, which appears on the left.

The top of the note says "Bank of Mauritius". The portrait is toward the center-left of the note and below the portrait is the name of the person in the portrait and their year of birth to year of death. On the bottom-left is the coat of arms of Mauritius. There is also a drawing of the Bank of Mauritius building and a portrayal of the statue of justice in the background of each of the denominations in the centre of the note. The value of the note is in the top-right corner with the "Rs" symbol in front the value. Below the value in the top-right corner is a feature to aid the visually impaired. This is in addition to the differences in sizes between the banknotes of various denominations. The left side of the note says the numerical value of the note, with the "Rs" symbol to the left of the value, written sideways left-faced up. On top of the numerical value on the left side is the serial number of the note. The serial number is also on the centre-right of the note. On the top-center of the note is states "This Note Is Legal Tender For", then it states the note's value written out in English (ex: "One Hundred"), and below that it says "Rupees". Below that it says the value of the note in Tamil, and below that it says the value of the note in Bhojpuri-Hindi. Below that is the signature of the Governor of the Bank of Mauritius and next to that is the signature of the  managing director, or it could have the signatures of the First Deputy Governor, then the Governor, then the Second Deputy Governor. Below that is the year the note was printed.

Reverse Designs

The top left of the note on the reverse says "Bank of Mauritius". The left side of the note says the numerical value of the note, with the "Rs" symbol to the left of the value, written sideways left-faced up. The top right of the note has the numerical value of the note with the "Rs" symbol to the left of the value. Each denomination carries a different vignette, depicting various aspects of Mauritius. The Devanagari script value of the note can be found on the left side of the bottom of the vignette, with the Devanagari abbreviation of rupee, "रु" ("ru") in front of the value. The Tamil and Gujarati numerical value of the note can be found on the right side of the bottom of the vignette. The Tamil value is above the Gujarati value.

Features for authenticity verification

 The feel of banknote's paper
 Three-dimensional watermark in the form of a dodo: When held up to the light the head of the dodo can be clearly viewed.
 See-through in the form of a conch shell: this image completes when viewed against direct light.
 Windowed security thread reading "Bank of Mauritius" when held up to the light, this can be seen as a continuous band running through the paper. Viewed flat, the metallic areas can be seen on the surface of the paper.
 Engraved Portrait in Intaglio ink.
 Latent image: when viewed at eye level, the image of "BM" becomes visible.
 Micro-text reading "BM": under a magnifying glass, these letters are clear to see.
 Under ultra-violet light: figures corresponding to the face value of the banknote become apparent.

Rs. 100/-, Rs. 200/-, Rs. 500/-, Rs. 1,000/-, Rs. 2,000/- banknotes

Iridescent band in gold: when held under the light, this band visualizes and disappears when the viewing angle is changed.

Rs. 100/-, Rs. 200/- banknotes

Silver metallic ink: dull silver metallic band running from top to bottom on front, left of note. Metallic strip also beneath top right value numeral.

Rs. 500/-, Rs. 1,000/- banknotes

Silver Foil: two different images, value numeral or geometric shape, can be seen when viewed from different angles.

Rs. 2,000/- banknote

Hologram containing images of the dodo and the value "2000"

Rs. 200/-, Rs. 500/-, Rs. 1,000/- banknotes

Hologram containing images of the dodo and the denomination on the Rs. 200/- banknote, a deer and the denomination on the Rs. 500/- banknote and the Bank of Mauritius tower and the denomination on the Rs. 1,000/- banknote.

Rs. 25/-, Rs. 50/-, Rs. 500/- banknotes

Revised security features and the change of material from paper to polymer.

Rs. 2,000/- banknote
Revised security features and the change of material from paper to polymer.

Commemorative coins

See also
 Economy of Mauritius
 Seychellois rupee

Notes

References

External links
Ministry Of Finance and Economic Development

Circulating currencies
Currencies of the British Empire
Currencies of the Commonwealth of Nations
Currencies of Mauritius
Rupee, Mauritian
1876 introductions